William Shakespeare Jr. (September 21, 1869June 25, 1950) was an American inventor.

Shakespeare was born to William Shakespeare, Sr. and Lydia A. Markley in Kalamazoo, Michigan, in 1869.

He invented the level-winding fishing reel. Shakespeare also founded and was one of the key people of Shakespeare Fishing Tackle, which he founded in 1897, as a fisherman aiming to improve the fishing-reel mechanism.

He was a traveling salesman of patent medicines.

In addition to numerous fishing-tackle innovations, Shakespeare also received patents for camera equipment and a carburetor.

See also

 List of inventors
 Lists of Americans

References

External links

1869 births
1950 deaths
19th-century American businesspeople
20th-century American businesspeople
American fishers
American inventors
People from Kalamazoo, Michigan